Fricks Locks Historic District or more simply Frick's Lock is an abandoned village, along the also abandoned Schuylkill Canal, in the northeast portion of East Coventry Township, Chester County, Pennsylvania.  This 18th-century village outlasted the canal, being abandoned in the late 20th century with the construction of the adjacent Limerick Nuclear Power Plant. The village on about 18 acres of land were listed as a historic district by the National Register of Historic Places in 2003. Frick's Locks is considered a modern ghost town and, although private property, attracts visitors.

History

Canal era
While some buildings date from the American Revolutionary War era, the village name was a result of the "Schuylkill Navigation" canal. The canal required construction, in the early 1820s, of a set of locks at that point along the Schuylkill River.  Locks #54 and #55 were built on farmland acquired from John Frick and the village became known as Frick's Locks.  The village thrived due to the economic stimulus of the canal. Eventually the commercial canal traffic declined toward the turn of the century and gave way to the railroad. Frick's Locks had become the singular Frick's Lock after the Pennsylvania Schuylkill Valley Railroad arrived and built a station with the latter name. The canal was filled in starting in 1942.  While the railroad eventually declined after Conrail was formed on April 1, 1976, the village remained inhabited until near the end of the 20th century.

Nuclear era
In the 1960s, the then Philadelphia Electric Company (PECO) began the process of building the Limerick Nuclear Power Station immediately across the river from Frick's Lock.  The station went on line in 1986.  During the project, PECO acquired all the land around the station site, which included Frick's Lock.  There are possibly conflicting stories as to the residents being bought out and relocated nearby and one that describes a 48-hour notice forced eviction.  In any event the buildings were vacated and simply boarded up.  There is evidence that some of the buildings were later occupied by an environmental study company retained by PECO.

Present day
In the late 1990s Paul S. Frick (1925-2014), in an effort to preserve the property along with family history, began compiling all of the historical information and then hired Estelle Cremers who lived in the area, to assist him. Paul paid for all the costs and work that led to the property being listed on the National Register of Historic Places on November 21, 2003. In February 2011, East Coventry Township partnered with Exelon Corporation to preserve and protect the historic site. Under this new agreement, Exelon  effectively donated the land and eleven historic structures at Frick's Lock Village to East Coventry Township, valued at an estimated $1 million. In addition, Exelon will spend close to $2.5 million to stabilize and rehabilitate these historic structures.As of late 2021, the majority of the old buildings are now surrounded by a substantial fence with padlocked gates. A few older buildings outside the fence near the parking lot have imagery of windows affixed where windows would be and imagery of doors where doors would be.  Another building near the parking lot has public restrooms, but those doors are frequently locked with no signage to explain if the restrooms are temporarily or permanently closed.In January 2022, access to the parking lot outside the village fence has been blocked with a new padlocked gate, presumably controlled by East Coventry Township.  Lacking any other public parking nearby, Frick's Lock stands to lose its stature as a trailhead for the Schuylkill River Trail that passes within a few dozen yards of the fenced-in village.

Ghost town

Because of its reputation as a modern ghost town, Frick's Lock attracts many curious individuals and groups, including ghost hunters.  Its isolated location and abandoned status also attracts vandals.  The inclusion of the Frick's Lock in the 2005 book, Weird Pennsylvania, and numerous web photo essays of the buildings have increased its popularity.  The web sites have also documented its increased deterioration, including the aforementioned vandalism and the collapse of some porch structures.

As of March 2008, Frick's Lock remains a hotbed for many thrill seekers and vandals. Interest in the area has grown since a fire destroyed the Lock Tender's House in February 2008. Since then, Exelon has made numerous attempts to clean up debris from the property and to close up open wells and open buildings. Vandals continue with their destruction of the buildings.

Police are now attempting to discourage the continued vandalism by citing all unauthorized people found on the property with trespassing.

See also
River Bend Farm

References

External links

 Exelon Corp. agrees to stabilize, preserve Frick's Lock's
 https://web.archive.org/web/20121002003845/http://a1.sphotos.ak.fbcdn.net/hphotos-ak-snc6/197375_1659397201521_1134896905_31410144_2922630_n.jpg

Houses on the National Register of Historic Places in Pennsylvania
Federal architecture in Pennsylvania
Geography of Chester County, Pennsylvania
Exelon
Ghost towns in Pennsylvania
Houses in Chester County, Pennsylvania
Historic districts on the National Register of Historic Places in Pennsylvania
National Register of Historic Places in Chester County, Pennsylvania
Populated places on the National Register of Historic Places in Pennsylvania